Jonathan Nicolas Camil Ferland (born February 9, 1983) is a Canadian professional ice hockey forward currently playing for Saint-Georges Cool FM 103.5 in the LNAH. Prior to this, Ferland played two seasons with the Belfast Giants in the Elite Ice Hockey League (EIHL). Ferland previously played for and captained the Vienna Capitals in the Austrian Hockey League (EBEL).He currently coaches the St Patrick's High School U17Major and the RSEQ Hockey Team in Quebec City Canada

Playing career
Ferland was born in Quebec City, Quebec. As a youth, he played in the 1996 and 1997 Quebec International Pee-Wee Hockey Tournaments with a minor ice hockey team from Beauce, Quebec.

Ferland was the property of National Hockey League's Montreal Canadiens and assigned to the American Hockey League's Hamilton Bulldogs for five seasons. He was drafted by the Canadiens in the 2002 NHL Entry Draft (7th round, 212 overall) making his NHL debut on January 3, 2006. Previously, he had played for the QMJHL's Moncton Wildcats and Acadie-Bathurst Titan.

He scored his first career goal in his NHL debut, a 6–4 loss on January 3, 2006 to Pittsburgh's Marc-André Fleury.

After 5 seasons, Ferland left the Bulldogs and Canadiens organization moving abroad to sign with EC VSV of the Erste Bank Eishockey Liga on May 13, 2008.

Ferland played three seasons with Villacher SV, including captaining the club in his final season in 2010–11 season, before signing with league rivals the Vienna Capitals on July 8, 2011.

After six seasons in Vienna, Ferland left as a free agent to sign a one-year deal with Northern Irish club, the Belfast Giants of the EIHL on July 12, 2017.

Career statistics

References

External links

1983 births
Living people
Acadie–Bathurst Titan players
Belfast Giants players
Canadian ice hockey forwards
French Quebecers
Hamilton Bulldogs (AHL) players
Montreal Canadiens draft picks
Montreal Canadiens players
Moncton Wildcats players
Ice hockey people from Quebec City
Saint-Georges Cool FM 103.5 players
Vienna Capitals players
EC VSV players
Canadian expatriate ice hockey players in Northern Ireland
Canadian expatriate ice hockey players in Austria